David Nkoua (born 28 January 1970) is a Congolese sprinter. He competed in the men's 100 metres at the 1992 Summer Olympics.

References

1970 births
Living people
Athletes (track and field) at the 1992 Summer Olympics
Republic of the Congo male sprinters
Olympic athletes of the Republic of the Congo
Place of birth missing (living people)